Monoplex klenei is a species of predatory sea snail, a marine gastropod mollusk in the family Cymatiidae.

Description

Distribution
This species occurs in the Indian Ocean off Mozambique.

References

 MacNae, W. & M. Kalk (eds) (1958). A natural history of Inhaca Island, Mozambique. Witwatersrand Univ. Press, Johannesburg. I-iv, 163 pp. 
 Steyn, D.G. & Lussi, M. (1998) Marine Shells of South Africa. An Illustrated Collector’s Guide to Beached Shells. Ekogilde Publishers, Hartebeespoort, South Africa, ii + 264 pp. page(s): 74

Cymatiidae
Gastropods described in 1889